H. Naci Mocan is a Turkish-American economist and scholar. He currently is the Ourso Distinguished Chair of Economics at Louisiana State University. He is an expert on labor economics, health economics, and the economics of crime.

Education and early life
Mocan was born in Istanbul, Turkey, where he attended Istanbul Erkek Lisesi. He studied economics at Bogazici University and received his Ph.D. in Economics from City University of New York. He was a research fellow at the Institute for the Study of Labor (IZA).

Research
Mocan is an expert in the areas of labor economics, health economics, and the economics of crime. In the early 2000s he became part of the debate on the effectiveness of the death penalty when his research found that the death penalty is a deterrent of crime. He also found that people who are considered to be ugly are more likely to be criminals. Recent work has examined the effects of education in developing countries, including the impact that education has on female empowerment and religiosity and superstition. He also was the first economist to use econometric tools to measure vengeance.

References

External links

Academics from Istanbul
Boğaziçi University alumni
Year of birth missing (living people)
Living people
Louisiana State University faculty
City University of New York alumni
American economists
Turkish emigrants to the United States